Vito Di Bari (born 7 April 1983) is an Italian former footballer.

Biography
Born in Trani, the Province of Barletta-Andria-Trani, Apulia (historically part of the Province of Bari until 2009), Di Bari started his career at Promozione club Bitonto. He then left for Serie D team Melfi (fifth division until 2014). In 2003, he left for Sambenedettese and in January 2004 left for Fermana.

In July 2005 he was signed by Frosinone. In January 2006 he was signed by Serie B club Cremonese. At the end of season Cremonese relegated and Frosinone promoted to Serie B as playoffs winner. Neither club wanted Di Bari and he left for San Marino. In the next season he left for Apulia team Taranto. However he left for Verona in January 2008.

Di Bari joined another southern Italy side Cosenza in July 2009 (of Calabria region) In January 2011 he left for hometown club Andria BAT along with Tommaso Coletti. Cosenza also signed Kris Thackray as part of the deal. Despite made 11 starts for the team, he was sold to Taranto as part of the deal to sign Matteo Berretti definitely (who already on loan at Andria since August 2010).

In 2012, he joined Serie B club Reggina. He wore no.21 shirt.

On 27 August 2013 Di Bari and Francesco Cernuto were signed by the third division club F.B.C. Unione Venezia. Di Bari signed a 2-year contract.

On 15 July 2014 he was signed by Pistoiese.

On 12 July 2019 it was confirmed, that Di Bari had joined USD Corato Calcio.

References

External links
 Lega Serie B Profile 
 Football.it Profile 
 
 
 

Italian footballers
Serie B players
Serie C players
Serie D players
A.S. Melfi players
A.S. Sambenedettese players
Fermana F.C. players
Frosinone Calcio players
U.S. Cremonese players
A.S.D. Victor San Marino players
A.S.D. Martina Calcio 1947 players
Taranto F.C. 1927 players
Hellas Verona F.C. players
Cosenza Calcio players
S.S. Fidelis Andria 1928 players
Reggina 1914 players
Venezia F.C. players
U.S. Pistoiese 1921 players
U.S. Catanzaro 1929 players
F.C. Rieti players
Association football defenders
People from Trani
1983 births
Living people
Footballers from Apulia
Sportspeople from the Province of Barletta-Andria-Trani